
Gmina Przyłęk is a rural gmina (administrative district) in Zwoleń County, Masovian Voivodeship, in east-central Poland. Its seat is the village of Przyłęk, which lies approximately 12 kilometres (7 mi) south-east of Zwoleń and 114 km (71 mi) south-east of Warsaw.

Villages
Gmina Przyłęk contains the villages and settlements of Andrzejów, Babin, Baryczka, Grabów nad Wisłą, Helenów, Ignaców, Krzywda, Kulczyn, Łagów, Łaguszów, Ławeczko Nowe, Ławeczko Stare, Lipiny, Lucimia, Mierziączka, Mszadla Dolna, Mszadla Nowa, Mszadla Stara, Okrężnica, Pająków, Przyłęk, Ruda, Rudki, Stefanów, Szlachecki Las, Wólka Łagowska, Wólka Zamojska, Wysocin, Załazy, Zamość Nowy and Zamość Stary.

Neighbouring gminas
Gmina Przyłęk is bordered by the gminas of Chotcza, Janowiec, Policzna, Puławy, Wilków and Zwoleń.

References
Polish official population figures 2006

Przylek
Zwoleń County